Alberta Provincial Highway No. 26, commonly referred to as Highway 26, is an east–west highway in central Alberta, Canada that connects Highway 13 in Camrose  to Highway 14 near Kinsella.  The route follows 12th Correction Line for its entire length, and does not pass through any communities east of Camrose.

The Highway 26 designation first belonged to a stretch of road near Drumheller.  The present-day alignment near Camrose was not commissioned until the 1970s, and in 2009 was extended from Highway 36 to reach the current eastern terminus at Highway 14.

Route description 
Highway 26 begins in the eastern outskirts of Camrose where it splits due east from Highway 13, which bends southeast toward Ohaton. Highway 26 proceeds east along the 12th Correction Line, first meeting Highway 834 at a T-intersection; Highway 834 becomes Highway 56 when it meets Highway 13. Highways 26 and 834 are concurrent for  before Highway 834 branches off north to Round Hill. Highway 26 continues east, intersecting Highways 854, 855 and 857.

History 
The original alignment of Highway 26 was in Kneehill County west of Drumheller. In 1970, Highway 26 was decommissioned and in subsequent years was renumbered to its current designations.

The section of present-day Highway 26 between Camrose and Highway 36 was commissioned in the late 1970s and was incrementally paved throughout the 1980s.  In 2009, Highway 615 between Highway 36 and Highway 14 was renumbered to become part of Highway 26.

Major intersections 
From west to east:

References 

026
Camrose, Alberta